Ntangki National Park is a national park located in Peren District of Nagaland, India. It was first designated as a national park in 1993. Among the species that inhabit the park are the rare hoolock gibbon, golden langur, hornbill, Asian palm civet, black stork, tiger, white-breasted kingfisher, monitor lizard, python and sloth bear. The name "Ntangki" is derived from the Zeme dialect of the Zeliangrong Nagas.

History
In March 1993, it was converted to Ntangki National Park.

Land Encroaching Issues about Ntangki National Park
 Status of Intangki National Park
 "ZVFEB claims responsibility for June 30 Ntangki killings"
 TPO seeks Prez intervention on Intangki National Park
 Intangki issue: TPO petitions govt
 Search Results, Eastern Mirror
 Search Results, Nagaland Post
 Google Search results about Ntangki National Park Issues

External links

Peren district

National parks in Nagaland
Protected areas of Nagaland
1923 establishments in India
Protected areas established in 1923